The iron–sulfur world hypothesis is a set of proposals for the origin of life and the early evolution of life advanced in a series of articles between 1988 and 1992 by Günter Wächtershäuser, a Munich patent lawyer with a degree in chemistry, who had been encouraged and supported by philosopher Karl R. Popper to publish his ideas. The hypothesis proposes that early life may have formed on the surface of iron sulfide minerals, hence the name.  It was developed by retrodiction (making a "prediction" about the past) from extant biochemistry (non-extinct, surviving biochemistry) in conjunction with chemical experiments.

Origin of life

Pioneer organism
Wächtershäuser proposes that the earliest form of life, termed the "pioneer organism", originated in a volcanic hydrothermal flow at high pressure and high (100 °C) temperature. It had a composite structure of a mineral base with catalytic transition metal centers (predominantly iron and nickel, but also perhaps cobalt, manganese, tungsten and zinc). The catalytic centers catalyzed autotrophic carbon fixation pathways generating small molecule (non-polymer) organic compounds from inorganic gases (e.g. carbon monoxide, carbon dioxide, hydrogen cyanide and hydrogen sulfide). These organic compounds were retained on or in the mineral base as organic ligands of the transition metal centers with a flow retention time in correspondence with their mineral bonding strength thereby defining an autocatalytic "surface metabolism". The catalytic transition metal centers became autocatalytic by being accelerated by their organic products turned ligands. The carbon fixation metabolism became autocatalytic by forming a metabolic cycle in the form of a primitive sulfur-dependent version of the reductive citric acid cycle. Accelerated catalysts expanded the metabolism and new metabolic products further accelerated the catalysts. The idea is that once such a primitive autocatalytic metabolism was established, its intrinsically synthetic chemistry began to produce ever more complex organic compounds, ever more complex pathways and ever more complex catalytic centers.

Nutrient conversions
The water gas shift reaction (CO + H2O → CO2 + H2) occurs in volcanic fluids with diverse catalysts or without catalysts.  The combination of ferrous sulfide (FeS, troilite) and hydrogen sulfide as reducing agents (both reagents are simultaneously oxidized in the reaction here under creating the disulfide bond, S–S) in conjunction with pyrite formation: 
 FeS + H2S → FeS2 + 2 H+ + 2 e−

 or with H2 directly produced instead of 2 H+ + 2 e−

 FeS + H2S → FeS2 + H2
has been demonstrated under mild volcanic conditions.  This key result has been disputed. Nitrogen fixation has been demonstrated for the isotope 15N2 in conjunction with pyrite formation. Ammonia forms from nitrate with FeS/H2S as reductant. Methylmercaptan [CH3-SH] and carbon oxysulfide [COS] form from CO2 and FeS/H2S, or from CO and H2 in the presence of NiS.

Synthetic reactions
Reaction of carbon monoxide (CO), hydrogen sulfide (H2S) and methanethiol CH3SH in the presence of nickel sulfide and iron sulfide generates the methyl thioester of acetic acid [CH3-CO-SCH3] and presumably thioacetic acid (CH3-CO-SH) as the simplest activated acetic acid analogues of acetyl-CoA. These activated acetic acid derivatives serve as starting materials for subsequent exergonic synthetic steps. They also serve for energy coupling with endergonic reactions, notably the formation of (phospho)anhydride compounds. However, Huber and Wächtershäuser reported low 0.5% acetate yields based on the input of CH3SH (methanethiol) (8 mM) in the presence of 350 mM CO. This is about 500 times and 3700 times  the highest CH3SH and CO concentrations respectively measured to date in a natural hydrothermal vent  fluid.

Reaction of nickel hydroxide with hydrogen cyanide (HCN) (in the presence or absence of ferrous hydroxide, hydrogen sulfide or methyl mercaptan) generates nickel cyanide, which reacts with carbon monoxide (CO) to generate pairs of α-hydroxy and α-amino acids: e.g. glycolate/glycine, lactate/alanine, glycerate/serine; as well as pyruvic acid in significant quantities. Pyruvic acid is also formed at high pressure and high temperature from CO, H2O, FeS in the presence of nonyl mercaptan. Reaction of pyruvic acid or other α-keto acids with ammonia in the presence of ferrous hydroxide or in the presence of ferrous sulfide and hydrogen sulfide generates alanine or other α-amino acids. Reaction of α-amino acids in aqueous solution with COS or with CO and H2S generates a peptide cycle wherein dipeptides, tripeptides etc. are formed and subsequently degraded via N-terminal hydantoin moieties and N-terminal urea moieties and subsequent cleavage of the N-terminal amino acid unit.

Proposed reaction mechanism for reduction of CO2 on FeS: Ying et al. (2007) have shown that direct transformation of mackinawite (FeS) to pyrite (FeS2) on reaction with H2S till 300 °C is not possible without the presence of critical amount of oxidant. In the absence of any oxidant, FeS reacts with H2S up to 300 °C to give pyrrhotite. Farid et al. have experimentally shown that mackinawite (FeS) has ability to reduce CO2 to CO at temperature higher than 300 °C. They reported that the surface of FeS is oxidized, which on reaction with H2S gives pyrite (FeS2). It is expected that CO reacts with H2O in the Drobner experiment to give H2.

Early evolution

Early evolution is defined as beginning with the origin of life and ending with the last universal common ancestor (LUCA). According to the iron–sulfur world theory it covers a coevolution of cellular organization (cellularization), the genetic machinery and enzymatization of the metabolism.

Cellularization

Cellularization occurs in several stages. It may have begun with the formation of primitive lipids (e.g. fatty acids or isoprenoid  acids) in the surface metabolism. These lipids accumulate on or in the mineral base. This lipophilizes the outer or inner surfaces of the mineral base, which promotes condensation reactions over hydrolytic reactions by lowering the activity of water and protons.

In the next stage lipid membranes are formed. While still anchored to the mineral base they form a semi-cell bounded partly by the mineral base and partly by the membrane. Further lipid evolution leads to self-supporting lipid membranes and closed cells. The earliest closed cells are pre-cells (sensu Kandler) because they allow frequent exchange of genetic material (e.g. by fusions). According to Woese, this frequent exchange of genetic material is the cause for the existence of the common stem in the tree of life and for a very rapid early evolution.

Proto-ecological systems
William Martin and Michael Russell suggest that the first cellular life forms may have evolved inside alkaline hydrothermal vents at seafloor spreading zones in the deep sea. These structures consist of microscale caverns that are coated by thin membraneous metal sulfide walls. Therefore, these structures would resolve several critical points germane to  Wächtershäuser's suggestions at once:

 the micro-caverns provide a means of concentrating newly synthesised molecules, thereby increasing the chance of forming oligomers;
 the steep temperature gradients inside the hydrothermal vent allow for establishing "optimum zones" of partial reactions in different regions of the vent (e.g. monomer synthesis in the hotter, oligomerisation in the cooler parts);
 the flow of hydrothermal water through the structure provides a constant source of building blocks and energy (chemical disequilibrium between hydrothermal hydrogen and marine carbon dioxide);
 the model allows for a succession of different steps of cellular evolution (prebiotic chemistry, monomer and oligomer synthesis, peptide and protein synthesis, RNA world, ribonucleoprotein assembly and DNA world) in a single structure, facilitating exchange between all developmental stages;
 synthesis of lipids as a means of "closing" the cells against the environment is not necessary, until basically all cellular functions are developed.

This model locates the "last universal common ancestor" (LUCA) within the inorganically formed physical confines of an alkaline hydrothermal vent, rather than assuming the existence of a free-living form of LUCA. The last evolutionary step en route to bona fide free-living cells would be the synthesis of a lipid membrane that finally allows the organisms to leave the microcavern system of the vent. This postulated late acquisition of the biosynthesis of lipids as directed by genetically encoded peptides is consistent with the presence of completely different types of membrane lipids in archaea and bacteria (plus eukaryotes). The kind of vent at the foreground of their suggestion is chemically more similar to the warm (ca. 100 °C) off ridge vents such as Lost City than to the more familiar black smoker type vents (ca. 350 °C).

In an abiotic world, a thermocline of temperatures and a chemocline in concentration is associated with the pre-biotic synthesis of organic molecules, hotter in proximity to the chemically rich vent, cooler but also less chemically rich at greater distances. The migration of synthesized compounds from areas of high concentration to areas of low concentration gives a directionality that provides both source and sink in a self-organizing fashion, enabling a proto-metabolic process by which acetic acid production and its eventual oxidization can be spatially organized.

In this way many of the individual reactions that are today found in central metabolism could initially have occurred independent of any developing cell membrane. Each vent microcompartment is functionally equivalent to a single cell. Chemical communities having greater structural integrity and resilience to wildly fluctuating conditions are then selected for; their success would lead to local zones of depletion for important precursor chemicals.  Progressive incorporation of these precursor components within a cell membrane would gradually increase metabolic complexity within the cell membrane, whilst leading to greater environmental simplicity in the external environment. In principle, this could lead to the development of complex catalytic sets capable of self-maintenance.

Russell adds a significant factor to these ideas, by pointing out that semi-permeable mackinawite (an iron sulfide mineral) and silicate membranes could naturally develop under these conditions and electrochemically link reactions separated in space, if not in time.

See also
 Abiogenesis
 Iron–sulfur protein
 RNA world
 Miller–Urey experiment

References

Origin of life
Metabolism

de:Chemische Evolution#Die Eisen-Schwefel-Welt (ESW) nach Wächtershäuser